A timing or valve chest is a compartment on an internal or external combustion engine (e.g. gasoline or steam engine) which provides access to the tappets and valves. The chest is fitted with an inspection cover sealed with a gasket.

Engine components
Combustion engineering